Bombas is an apparel brand. The company originally sold socks and began selling T-shirts in 2019. For every item purchased, a clothing item is donated to a homeless shelter or homelessness-related charity.

History

Bombas launched in 2013, after founders Randy Goldberg and David Heath learned that socks are the most requested clothing item in homeless shelters. They established the brand’s mission to donate one pair of socks for every pair purchased.

The company first received funding in 2013, raising nearly $145,000 through the crowdfunding website Indiegogo. A year later, the company raised $1 million in seed funding from friends and family. The founders appeared on a September 2014 episode of ABC’s Shark Tank and secured a deal with Daymond John. In 2018, the company exceeded $100 million in revenue.

By April 2020, Bombas had donated 35 million pairs of socks.

In June 2020, Bombas released a collection of socks for which the company would donate an apparel item to a charity supporting LGBT youth for each item purchased.

See also

List of sock manufacturers

References

External links 
 Good Morning America feature

American companies established in 2013
Clothing companies established in 2013
Clothing manufacturers
Companies based in New York City
B Lab-certified corporations